1917 Cuyo is an stony asteroid and near-Earth object of the Amor group, approximately  in diameter. It was discovered on 1 January 1968, by astronomer Carlos Cesco and A. G. Samuel at El Leoncito Observatory, Argentina.

Orbit and classification 

Cuyo orbits the Sun at a distance of 1.1–3.2 AU once every 3 years and 2 months (1,151 days; semi-major axis of 2.15 AU). Its orbit has an eccentricity of 0.51 and an inclination of 24° with respect to the ecliptic.

Naming 

This minor planet is named in honor of the Universidad Nacional de Cuyo, which operated the observatory at El Leoncito in collaboration with Columbia and Yale University. Cuyo is also the name of a region in central-west Argentina. The official  was published by the Minor Planet Center on 1 June 1975.

Physical characteristics 

SMASS classification Cuyo is a stony Sl-type. In 1989, Cuyo was detected with radar from the Arecibo Observatory at a distance of 0.17 AU. The measured radar cross-section was 2.5 km2. According to the survey carried out by NASA's Wide-field Infrared Survey Explorer with its subsequent NEOWISE mission, Cuyo measures 5.7 kilometers in diameter and its surface has an albedo of 0.195.

References

External links 
 Asteroid Lightcurve Database (LCDB), query form (info )
 Dictionary of Minor Planet Names, Google books
 Asteroids and comets rotation curves, CdR – Observatoire de Genève, Raoul Behrend
 
 
 

001917
Discoveries by Carlos Ulrrico Cesco
Named minor planets
001917
001917
19680101